Richard A. Eckstrom (born June 23, 1948) is an American politician from the state of South Carolina. A Republican, he has served as the comptroller general of South Carolina since 2003.

Early life
Eckstrom was born in Duluth, Minnesota, on June 23, 1948. His family moved to Columbia, South Carolina, in 1957, when his father, a professor, took a job at the University of South Carolina (USC). He graduated from USC in 1971 with a bachelor's degree. He served in the United States Navy, reaching the rank of captain, and worked in business. Eckstrom returned to school and earned a Master of Business Administration from USC in 1977. He went to work for Peat Marwick Mitchell in Columbia in 1978. He earned a master's degree in accounting from USC in 1978. He is a certified public accountant.

Career
In the 1994 elections, Eckstrom ran as a Republican for Treasurer of South Carolina and defeated Grady Patterson, a Democrat who served in the role for 28 years. Patterson defeated Eckstrom in the 1998 elections. In 1999, Eckstrom ran in a special election to the South Carolina House of Representatives to succeed André Bauer, who resigned after being elected to the South Carolina Senate. Eckstrom lost to Chip Huggins.

In 2002, Eckstrom ran for comptroller general of South Carolina. He defeated Jim Lander, the incumbent, in the general election. He was reelected in 2006, 2010, 2014, and 2018. He won reelection to a sixth term without opposition in 2022.

2023 accounting error

In February 2023, Eckstrom informed the South Carolina Senate that the budget was off by $3.5 billion due to an accounting error. According to Eckstrom, over the period of ten years, money was given to colleges and universities but was not reflected in financial records. Eckstrom blammed an issue in the state's accounting system dating back to 2007. In March, representative Gil Gatch introduced a resolution that could begin an impeachment inquiry. After an investigation from the Senate Finance Constitutional subcommittee, the panel recommended that Eckstrom be removed from office and that the office of comptroller general be abolished. Subcommittee members agreed that Eckstrom’s actions did not constitute an impeachable offense as there was no criminal misconduct. But they recommended that South Carolina’s General Assembly to remove the comptroller from office for willful neglect of duty, as allowed by the state constitution.

On March 14, the South Carolina House of Representatives passed a constitutional amendment 104-7 that, if passed by the Senate and signed by the governor, would reduce Eckstrom's salary to $1 annually for the remainder of his term.

Personal life
Eckstrom and his first wife, Peggy, had three children. Eckstrom married Kelly Payne in December 2019.

References

External links

|-

1948 births
Comptrollers General of South Carolina
Living people
Military personnel from South Carolina
Politicians from Columbia, South Carolina
Politicians from Duluth, Minnesota
South Carolina Republicans
State treasurers of South Carolina
University of South Carolina alumni
United States Navy officers
Military personnel from Minnesota